The Catholic Orthodox Union of Saints Peter and Paul (COUSPP) was an organisation of English-speaking bishops in the United Kingdom designed to promote cooperation between traditional Independent Catholic denominations. COUSPP was centred on the Ecumenical Society of Saint Augustine of Canterbury, the Arch-Confraternity of Our Lady of Victories and the Old Holy Catholic Church. It was formally disbanded in October 2010.

Reasons for the formation of COUSPP
Traditionalist Independent Catholicism in the United Kingdom is very small in scale compared to the Church of England and the Catholic Church. Traditional Independent Catholicism in England has sometimes been associated with disputes between like-minded denominations who often share doctrinal points in common and share a common apostolic succession. Disputes between English-speaking Traditional Catholics have split the movement, been divisive and prevented partnership working.

In July 2007 a mutually agreed move towards coordination was initiated between three Independent Catholic denominations which see themselves as traditional and Orthodoxy to form a coordinating council that would coordinate development and be a forum for joint discussion and debate.

The London Agreement
The foundation of COUSPP was agreed and formed by Metropolitan bishops Robert McBride and Anthony Earl-Williams. COUSPP's governing document is the London Agreement, compiled by Thomas Bodkin and signed by participants on 31 March 2007. 
Bishop Robert McBride resigned as Metropolitan of the Ecumenical Society of St. Augustine and his successor is Bishop Martyn Douglas who has taken that Society in a more central Catholic direction with use of the new translation of the Mass.  At that point COUSPP was formally dissolved by the desire of the Chapter of the ArchConfraternity of Our Lady of Victories and its Metropolitan, Anthony Earl-Williams. The ArchConfraternity had never regarded itself as "Old" Catholic, but a part of the worldwide family of traditional Roman Catholics, using only the Tridentine Rite of Mass in both Latin and English.
In 2011 Robert McBride was formally received into The ArchConfraternity.

References

External links
The Revised Mandate of the COUSPP
Archconfraternity of Our Lady of Victories
TESSAC TESSAC was formed in November 2008 by Robert McBride, upon whose resignation was succeeded as Metropolitan of TESSAC by Martyn Douglas.

Christian organizations established in 2007
Christian denominations established in the 21st century